Castañuelas is a town and municipality located in Monte Cristi Province, Dominican Republic. Its total population is 14,878 with the urban population at 4,005.

References

Populated places in Monte Cristi Province
Municipalities of the Dominican Republic